Batteau was a small fishing village on the Island of Ponds, off the southeastern coast of Labrador. It was a port of call for ships in 1911. The station was served by the C.N.R. Express after June 1953. The first post office opened on August 6, 1962 and the first Post Mistress was Stella Dyson. The community was later depopulated.

See also
 List of ghost towns in Newfoundland and Labrador

Ghost towns in Newfoundland and Labrador